Sadaif Mehdi (born 14 August 1994) is a Pakistani cricketer. He made his first-class debut for Multan in the 2013–14 Quaid-e-Azam Trophy on 23 October 2013.

References

External links
 

1994 births
Place of birth missing (living people)
Living people
Pakistani cricketers
Multan cricketers
United Bank Limited cricketers
Water and Power Development Authority cricketers
Southern Punjab (Pakistan) cricketers